The 1975 Australian Sports Car Championship was a CAMS sanctioned Australian motor racing title open to Group A Sports Cars and Group D Production Sports Cars. The championship was contested over a single race staged at the Phillip Island circuit in Victoria, Australia on 30 November 1975. The race was run over 30 laps of the 4.76 km circuit, a total race distance of 143 km. It was the seventh Australian Sports Car Championship, and the only one in the twenty-year history of the title to be contested over a single race rather than over a series of races.

The championship was won by Garrie Cooper, driving an Elfin MS7.

Results

 Number of entries: 66
 Number of starters: Unknown  
 Number of finishers: 20
 Pole position: Garrie Cooper (Elfin MS7), 1:47.2
 Winner's race time: 54:44.6
 Fatstest lap: Garrie Cooper (Elfin MS7) 1:45.6

Notes & references

Further reading
 Jim Shepherd, A History of Australian Motor Sport, 1980, pages 173-174

External links
 www.autopics.com.au 
 Gibbo’s Tipo : Fred Gibson : Alfa Tipo 33/3 in Australia…, primotipo.com

Australian Sports Car Championship
Sports Car Championship
Motorsport at Phillip Island